Matthew Prior was a poet and diplomat.

Matthew Prior may also refer to:

Matt Prior (born 1982), English cricketer
Matt Prior (rugby league) (born 1987), Australian rugby league footballer

See also
Matthew Pryor (disambiguation)